The Church of the Redeemer is a historic Episcopal church located at 123 Third Street North in Cannon Falls in the U.S. state of Minnesota. The building was built with limestone and wood in 1867.

Episcopal families started meeting in private homes for about eight years before they decided to build a church. In 1866, the congregation decided to build a church. Christopher Doner drew up the plans, while Lester Bancroft did the masonry. The stone was Platteville Limestone quarried from a farm north of Cannon Falls. Bishop Henry Benjamin Whipple laid the cornerstone on June 28, 1866. When the church was complete, at a cost of about $3500, Bishop Whipple returned on May 1, 1867, to consecrate the church.

On February 12, 1980, it was added to the National Register of Historic Places.

Gallery

References

External links

19th-century Episcopal church buildings
Churches completed in 1867
Churches in Goodhue County, Minnesota
Episcopal church buildings in Minnesota
Churches on the National Register of Historic Places in Minnesota
National Register of Historic Places in Goodhue County, Minnesota